The Esperance District Football Association is an Australian rules football league based in the city of Esperance in Western Australia.  It was formed in 1956.

Clubs

Current

Former

2010 ladder 
																			
																			
Finals

2011 ladder 
																			
																			
Finals

2012 ladder 
																			
																			
Finals

Further reading 
 A Way of Life - The Story of country football in Western Australia - Alan East

References

Australian rules football competitions in Western Australia